Eleva is a village in Trempealeau County, Wisconsin, along the Buffalo River. The population was 670 at the 2010 Census and reached 685 in the 2020 Census.

History
The village was originally named "New Chicago". The grain elevator had the letters "ELEVA" painted on it before winter struck. Newcomers assumed the letters were the name of the village. The village was founded in 1880. A post office called Eleva has been in operation since 1885.

Geography
Eleva is located at  (44.575298, −91.471019).

Demographics

2010 census
As of the census of 2010, there were 670 people, 292 households, and 181 families living in the village. The racial makeup of the village was 97.9% White, 0.1% Native American, 0.3% Asian, 0.7% from other races, and 0.9% from two or more races. Hispanic or Latino of any race were 1.3% of the population.

There were 292 households, of which 33.6% had children under the age of 18 living with them, 44.2% were married couples living together, 11.6% had a female householder with no husband present, 6.2% had a male householder with no wife present, and 38.0% were non-families. Of all households, 31.2% were made up of individuals, and 16.8% had someone living alone who was 65 years of age or older. The average household size was 2.29 and the average family size was 2.86.

The median age in the village was 39.5 years. 24.5% of residents were under the age of 18; 8.1% were between the ages of 18 and 24; 26% were from 25 to 44; 23.9% were from 45 to 64; and 17.6% were 65 years of age or older. The gender makeup of the village was 48.7% male and 51.3% female.

2000 census
As of the census of 2000, there were 635 people, 277 households, and 175 families living in the village. The population density was 1,169.0 people per square mile (454.0/km2). There were 290 housing units at an average density of 533.9 per square mile (207.4/km2). The racial makeup of the village was 98.43% White, 0.16% African American, 0.16% Native American, 0.16% Asian, and 1.10% from two or more races.

There were 277 households, out of which 26.7% had children under the age of 18 living with them, 49.5% were married couples living together, 9.4% had a female householder with no husband present, and 36.8% were non-families. Of all households, 33.9% were made up of individuals, and 15.9% had someone living alone who was 65 years of age or older. The average household size was 2.29 and the average family size was 2.89.

In the village, the population was spread out, with 23.5% under the age of 18, 7.1% from 18 to 24, 28.7% from 25 to 44, 21.3% from 45 to 64, and 19.5% who were 65 years of age or older. The median age was 38 years. For every 100 females, there were 98.4 males. For every 100 females age 18 and over, there were 92.1 males.

The median income for a household in the village was $31,250, and the median income for a family was $41,964. Males had a median income of $30,294 versus $21,618 for females. The per capita income for the village was $15,814. About 5.6% of families and 9.5% of the population were below the poverty line, including 11.6% of those under age 18 and 8.1% of those age 65 or over.

References

External links
 School District of Eleva-Strum
  2010 U.S. Census

Villages in Trempealeau County, Wisconsin
Villages in Wisconsin